Mychocerus discretus is a species of minute bark beetle in the family Cerylonidae. It is found in North America.

References

Further reading

 
 

Cerylonidae
Articles created by Qbugbot
Beetles described in 1890